Sewellia is a genus of fish in the family Balitoridae (River Loaches) found in Laos and Vietnam. According to Roberts (1998) a possible defining characteristic of the genus Sewellia is their posterior pelvic valve is highly complex and different from other rheophilic loaches (loaches adapted to fast flowing water), their posterior pelvic valve involves the overlapping of the second to last ventrally exposed rays. Adapted to high velocity streams Sewellia have depressed body shapes that are laterally expanded thus increasing their hydrodynamical properties and allowing them to better stay attached to rocks in swift current. Sewellia also have paired fins with a single simple ray and numerous branched rays allowing them to grip rocks in swift current.

Distribution 
Fish in the genus Sewellia occur in the Sekong River, a tributary of the Mekong river. The Sekong river drains large parts of central and southeast Laos as well as southern Vietnam.

Habitat and Ecology 
Sewellia are found in the rapids and riffles of steep gradient 'hill streams', hence the common name Hillstream Loache. Due to their steep gradients these streams have high current velocities, Sewellia are known to inhabit streams with current velocities exceeding 1 m · s−1 in some habitats. Sewellia feed mainly on micro to macro sized aquatic invertebrates that inhabit the periphyton attached to submerged rocks.

Sexual Dimorphism  
Sewellia are sexually dimorphic, males have soft elevated patches of fine tubercles on the anterior part of pectoral-fin rays 1-6, females do not. Sewellia lineolata are common in the aquaria trade, they are sexed based on differences in shape, at sexual maturity males tend to be more streamlined while females are somewhat broad; the beginning of the pectoral fins occurs at a much sharper angle in the male than females, females have pectoral fins that begin in a more rounded fashion (softer angle).

Species 
There are currently 14 recognized species in this genus:

 Sewellia albisuera Freyhof, 2003
 Sewellia analis H. D. Nguyễn & V. H. Nguyễn, 2005
 Sewellia breviventralis Freyhof & Serov, 2000
 Sewellia diardi T. R. Roberts, 1998
 Sewellia elongata T. R. Roberts, 1998
 Sewellia hypsicrateae Endruweit & T. D. P. Nguyễn, 2016 
 Sewellia lineolata (Valenciennes, 1846)
 Sewellia marmorata Serov, 1996
 Sewellia medius H. D. Nguyễn & V. H. Nguyễn, 2005
 Sewellia monolobata (H. D. Nguyễn & V. H. Nguyễn, 2005)
 Sewellia patella Freyhof & Serov, 2000
 Sewellia pterolineata T. R. Roberts, 1998
 Sewellia speciosa T. R. Roberts, 1998
 Sewellia trakhucensis H. D. Nguyễn & V. H. Nguyễn, 2005

Conservation Status 
•Sewellia albisuera-IUCN Critically Endangered

•Sewellia analis-IUCN Not Evaluated

•Sewellia breviventralis - IUCN Critically Endangered

•Sewellia diardi-IUCN Data Deficient

•Sewellia elongata-IUCN Near Threatened

•Sewellia hypsicrateae-IUCN Not Evaluated

•Sewellia lineolataSewellia  -IUCN Vulnerable

•Sewellia marmorata- IUCN Endangered

•Sewellia medius-IUCN Not Evaluated

•Sewellia monolobata-IUCN Not Evaluated Sewellia  

•Sewellia patella- IUCN Endangered

•Sewellia pterolineata-IUCN EndangeredSewellia 

•Sewellia speciosa-IUCN Least Concern

•Sewellia trakhucensis-IUCN Not Evaluated Sewellia

References

Freshwater fish genera
Gastromyzontidae
Taxa named by Sunder Lal Hora